Maria Skalińska (1890-1977) was a Polish botanist and professor who studied plant anatomy and cell biology, particularly the plants of the Tatra mountains.  She was the first to describe the species Poa nobilis.

References 

1890 births
1977 deaths
20th-century Polish women scientists
20th-century Polish botanists
Polish educators